is an accomplished Japanese animator and anime director. He is also a founding member of the Japan Animation Creators Association (JAniCA) labor group.

Nakamura's 2001 film A Tree of Palme was an official selection of the Berlin Film Festival. His work on Golden Warrior Gold Lightan inspired fellow animator Koji Morimoto.

Works
 Yatterman (1977): animation director and key animation
 Ōgon Senshi Gold Lightan (1981): animation director and key animation
 Genma Taisen (1983): key animation
 Mirai Keisatsu Urashiman (1983): character designs, animation director, key animation, storyboards
 Nausicaä of the Valley of the Wind (1984): key animation
 Meikyū Monogatari (1987): animation director
 Robot Carnival (1987): director, script, character designs, animation
 AKIRA (1988): animation director, character designs
 Peter Pan no Bōken (1989): character designs, scene artist, storyboards
 Catnapped! (1995): director, original creator, script, character design, animation director
 Sonic the Hedgehog (OVA) (1996): colour background painter
 A Tree of Palme (2001): director, original creator, script
 Tetsujin 28-go (2004): character designs and storyboards
 Fantastic Children (2004): director, original creator, script, character designs
 Harmony (2015): director (with Michael Arias)
 Ballmastrz: Rubicon (2023): animation director

Books
 Yume no Naka e (夢の中へ). Tokuma Motion Book , 1985.
 Catnapped! Storyboard (とつぜん!ネコの国 バニパルウィット 絵コンテ). 	Triangle Staff.
 Twilight (TWILIGHT). Anime Style , 2006. 
 King Abyss (キングアビス). Jive , 2009. 
 King Abyss: Adama hen (キングアビス アダマ篇). PIE International , 2014. Vol.1:  Vol.2:

References

External links
  
 Interview

Anime directors
Japanese animators
Japanese animated film directors
Japanese film directors
People from Yamanashi Prefecture
1955 births
Living people